Top Hits is the first greatest hits album by Mexican singer Paulina Rubio. It was released on July 18, 2000, through EMI Latin in United States. The album was released in two different editions, standard and limited, with the latter containing two remixes incorporates elements of Rubio's earlier singles. The album includes a new track: "Será Entre Tú Y Yo", which was previously released on the 1996 Olympics album Voces Unidas.

Top Hits received mixed reviews from music critics. Allmusic felt that it brings Paulina Rubio's best, before crossing over with her first English-language. The compilation album reached number thirty in Spain, despite receiving promotion from the singer.

Material
The album consists with thirteen greatest hits from Rubio's first records: "Mío", "Amor De Mujer", and "Sabor A Miel" from La Chica Dorada (1992); "Nieva, Nieva", "Él Me Engañó", and "Asunto De Dos" from 24 Kilates (1993); "Te Daría Mi Vida", "Nada De Ti", "Hoy Te Dejé De Amar", and "Bésame En La Boca" from El Tiempo Es Oro (1995); and, "Siempre Tuya Desde La Raíz", "Solo Por Ti", and "Enamorada" from Planeta Paulina (1996). The newly material for the album, which was included for the first time in a compilation album of the singer, begins with previously released for the 1996 Summer Olympics album Voces Unidas, "Será Entre Tú Y Yo", written by Marco Flores, and produced by Oscar Mediavilla. The "energetic and rhythmic" final tracks "Megahits" incorporates elements of Rubio's biggest hit singles remix by DJ Eduardo Posadas.

Critical reception
Drago Bonacich of Allmusic opined that the collection of greatest hits "comprising more than a decade of romantic ballads and dance/pop songs", and explained "Top Hits brings Paulina Rubio's best, before crossing over with her first English-language single called "Sexual Lover".

Track listing

Charts

References

External links
Official website

2000 greatest hits albums
Paulina Rubio compilation albums
Spanish-language compilation albums
EMI Records compilation albums